RGP3 may refer to:

 UDP-arabinopyranose mutase, an enzyme
 RGS3, a regulator of G-protein signaling 3